Mort aux Vaches is the name of a series of albums released by the Staalplaat record label in collaboration with the Dutch radio station, VPRO. The name translates literally from French as “Death to Cows,” with “cows” being French slang for cops - it is equivalent to “Death to Pigs” in English.

Format

Each album in the series is a live session by a particular artist, recorded in the VPRO studios. The releases keep to the principles of Staalplaat by being packaged in a peculiar and interesting way, including using sand paper and copper. Each release is limited to around 1000 copies.

Artists

Most artists who contribute to the series make electronic music, with a particular bias towards experimental and ambient electronica. Other genres are also represented, such as metal and noise music. Artists who have released an album as part of the series include:

External links 
 Official label site on Staalplaat’s website.
 Albums on the Mort aux Vaches label on Discogs.
 Origin of the expression mort-aux-vaches

Radio station compilation album series